Ekaterina is a Russian feminine given name, and an alternative transliteration of the Russian Yekaterina. Katya and Katyusha are common diminutive forms of Ekaterina. Notable people with the name can be found below.

Arts
Ekaterina Medvedeva (born 1937), Russian naïve painter
Ekaterina Sedia (born 1970), Russian fantasy author

Sports
Yekaterina Abramova (born 1982), Russian speed skater
Ekaterina Alexandrova (born 1997), Russian professional tennis player 
Ekaterina Alexandrovskaya (2000–2020), Russian-Australian pairs skater
Ekaterina Anikeeva (born 1969), Russian water polo player
Ekaterina Bychkova (born 1985), Russian professional tennis player
Ekaterina Dafovska (born 1975), Bulgarian biathlete
Ekaterina Dzehalevich (born 1986), Belarusian professional tennis player
Yekaterina Gamova (born 1980), Russian volleyball player
Ekaterina Gordeeva (born 1971), Russian Olympic and World figure skating champion
Ekaterina Ivanova (biathlete) (born 1977), Belarusian biathlete
Ekaterina Ivanova (tennis) (born 1987), Bychkova's Russian compatriot and professional tennis player
Ekaterina Karsten (born 1972), Belarusian rower
Yekaterina Khramenkova (born 1956), Soviet long-distance runner
Ekaterina Kramarenko (born 1991), Russian artistic gymnast
Yekaterina Lobaznyuk (born 1983), Olympic gymnast who competed for Russia in the 2000 Olympic Games in Sydney
Yekaterina Lobysheva (born 1985), Russian speed skater
Ekaterina Makarova (born 1988), Ivanova's Russian compatriot and professional tennis player
Ekaterina Nikolaidou (born 1992), Greek rower athlete
Yekaterina Podkopayeva (born 1952), middle-distance runner who represented the USSR and later Russia
Ekaterina Shatnaya (born 1979), Kazakhstani athlete
Yekaterina Smirnova (born 1956), Soviet heptathlete
Ekaterina Aleksandrovna Vasilieva (born 1976), Russian water polo player
Ekaterina Vandaryeva, a Russian kickboxer
Ekaterina Selezneva (born 1995), Russian rhythmic gymnast

Politics
Catherine the Great in Russian called as Yekaterina Velikaya
Ekaterina Furtseva (1910–1974), first woman to be admitted into Politburo
Ekaterina Kalinina (1882-1960), Soviet politician and First Lady of the Soviet Union
Yekaterina Kuskova (1869–1958), Russian Marxist political figure
Yekaterina Vorontsova-Dashkova (1743–1810), the closest female friend of Empress Catherine the Great
Ekaterina Svanidze (1880–1907), Georgian first wife of Joseph Stalin
Eka (Ekaterine) Tkeshelashvili (born 1977), Georgian jurist and former minister of foreign affairs of Georgia

Other fields
Yekaterina Geltzer (1876–1962), prima ballerina of the Bolshoi Ballet who danced in the theatre from 1898 to 1935
Yekaterina Golubeva (1966–2011), Russian actress
Ekaterina 'Katia' Ivanova (born 1988), Kazakh-born English model and contestant on Celebrity Big Brother 2010
Ekaterina Korbut, woman Grandmaster of chess
Ekaterina Maximova (1939–2009), Russian ballerina
Ekaterina Peshkova (1887–1965), Russian human rights activist and humanitarian
Ekaterina Polovnikova-Atalik (born 1982), Russian-Turkish Grandmaster of chess
Ekaterina Zelyonaya (1902–1991), Soviet actress and singer of Ukrainian ancestry
Yekaterina 'Katya' Petrovna Zamolodchikova (born 1982), American drag queen and actor

Fictional characters
Yekaterina "Katya" Derevko
Ekaterina Golovkina, a character in the Life
Ekaterina Dmitrievna Smokovnikova, The Road to Calvary
Kate Daniels from the Magic Series by Ilona Andrew's. Kate' real name is Ekaterina, but she always calls herself Kate.
Ekaterina Alexandrovna Shcherbatskaya (Kitty), a character in Anna Karenina

See also
Katherine
Ekaterina (novel), a novel by Donald Harington
Ekaterina (TV series), based on the life of Catherine the Great
Ekaterina, branch in the Cahill family (The 39 Clues)

References

Bulgarian feminine given names
Slavic feminine given names
Russian feminine given names
Ukrainian feminine given names